Angus McCuish was a Scottish amateur footballer who appeared in the Scottish League for Queen's Park as a inside left.

Personal life 
McCuish served as a lieutenant in the 2nd Queen Victoria's Own Rajput Light Infantry during the First World War.

Career statistics

References

1889 births
Scottish footballers
Scottish Football League players
Indian Army personnel of World War I
Association football inside forwards
Queen's Park F.C. players
British Indian Army officers
Place of death missing
People from Renfrew
Date of death missing